Marie-Louise Fitzpatrick (born 2 March 1962) is an Irish writer and illustrator best known for children's novels. She has won 10 CBI Book of the Year Awards (formerly Bisto Awards), including 4 awards for Book of the Year.

Works

Picture books
An Chanáil (1988) — Bisto Book of the Decade Award, Readers Association of Ireland Book Award, Irish Book Awards Design Medal
The Sleeping Giant (1991) — Bisto Merit Award
The Long March (1999) — Bisto Merit Award, RAI Special Merit Award; also named a Smithsonian Notable Book and IBBY Honour Book (illustration)
Izzy and Skunk (2000) — Bisto Book of the Year (shared)
Lizzy and Skunk (2000)
I'm a Tiger Too (2000) — Premier of Queensland recommended read
You, Me and the Big Blue Sea (2002) — Bisto Book of the Year, Eason Book of the Month August 2003
Silly Mummy, Silly Daddy (2006)
I Am I (2006)
Silly Mommy, Silly Daddy (2006)
Silly School (2006)
There (2009) — Bisto Book of the Year, Bisto Illustration Honour Award, Eric Carle Museum Best Picture Books of 2009 choice
Silly Baby (2010)

Novels
Timecatcher (2010) — Dubray Books Book of the Month, May 2010
Dark Warning (2012) — CBI Book of the Year Honour Award for Fiction
Hagwitch (2013) — CBI Book of the Year and Fiction Honour Award
On Midnight Beach (2020) — CILIP Carnegie Medal Shortlist

References

External links

 

1962 births
Living people
Writers from Dublin (city)
Irish women novelists
20th-century Irish novelists
21st-century Irish novelists
Irish women children's writers
20th-century Irish women writers
21st-century Irish women writers
Irish children's book illustrators